Macai Simmons (born 19 August 1992) is a Bermudian cricketer. He played in three matches for Bermuda in the 2018 ICC World Cricket League Division Four tournament in Malaysia.

In August 2019, he was named in Bermuda's squad for the Regional Finals of the 2018–19 ICC T20 World Cup Americas Qualifier tournament. He made his Twenty20 International (T20I) debut for Bermuda against Canada on 24 August 2019. In September 2019, he was named in Bermuda's squad for the 2019 ICC T20 World Cup Qualifier tournament in the United Arab Emirates.

In October 2021, he was named in Bermuda's squad for the 2021 ICC Men's T20 World Cup Americas Qualifier tournament in Antigua.

References

External links
 

1992 births
Living people
Bermudian cricketers
Bermuda Twenty20 International cricketers
Place of birth missing (living people)